John McDermott is a former Gaelic footballer who played for the Meath county team. He had much success playing inter-county football in the 1990s on the Meath teams managed by Sean Boylan. For Meath he played in the midfield position.

Playing career

Club
McDermott played club football first for Curraha and later Skryne.

Inter-county
McDermott was on the Meath panel that reached the 1991 All-Ireland Senior Football Championship Final. He had to be taken off injured in Meath's surprising first round loss to Laois in 1992. Then he was wild lucky not to be sent off in the 1996 All-Ireland Senior Football Championship Final.

During his playing career he won two All-Ireland Senior Football Championship medals (1996, 1999), as well as three Leinster Senior Football Championship medals and one National Football League medal. He also won 2 All Star awards. He retired after the 2000 season but returned for the All-Ireland series of the 2001 season.

International rules
As well as playing for Meath, McDermott played in some of the Test matches against Australia in some of the International Rules Series. He was made the captain of the Irish team in 1998 and 1999.

References

External links
 Official Meath Website

Year of birth missing (living people)
Living people
Irish international rules football players
Meath inter-county Gaelic footballers
Skryne Gaelic footballers
Winners of two All-Ireland medals (Gaelic football)